Brookings is a surname. Notable people with the surname include:

 Robert S. Brookings (1850–1932), American businessman and philanthropist
 Wilmot Brookings (1830–1905), American pioneer, frontier judge, and politician

See also
Brooking